Pavel Lesh (7 May 1887 – 12 February 1915) was a Russian sports shooter. He competed in four events at the 1912 Summer Olympics.

References

1887 births
1915 deaths
Russian male sport shooters
Olympic shooters of Russia
Shooters at the 1912 Summer Olympics
People from Ardahan